The Guan River, also known as Guanyang River, is a right-bank tributary of the upper Xiang River in Guilin, Guangxi, China. The river rises in Liziping of Dazhuyuan Village, Dongjing Township, Guanyang County. Its main stream runs generally southwest to northeast through Guanyang and Jiahe counties, and it joins the Xiang at Xiaonan Village of Quanzhou Town, Quanzhou.

References

Rivers of Guangxi